Ullswater Aerodrome  is an aerodrome located adjacent to Ullswater, Ontario, Canada.

References 

Registered aerodromes in Ontario